Subconscious Password is a 2013 3-D animated film by Chris Landreth offering an imaginary, comedic look at the inner workings of Landreth's mind, as he tries to remember someone's name at a party.

The film was produced the National Film Board of Canada (NFB) with the participation of Copperheart Entertainment and the Seneca College Animation Arts Centre. The film is made with computer animation, as well as pixilation sequences at the beginning and end of the film, featuring animation director John R. Dilworth as the friend whose name Landreth cannot recall. Subconscious Password is Landreth's first 3-D film and third with the NFB, Copperheart Entertainment and Seneca College. The idea for the film came to Landreth after watching a rerun of Password in 2010.

Synopsis
The film presents the mental process of remembering a friend's name as it were an episode of the old Password game show, with various celebrities attempting to assist Landreth.

Production
More than fifteen Seneca College graduating students worked on Subconscious Password, supported by five faculty members, as part of the Seneca Summer Animation Institute. After graduation, a number of these students were hired to work on the project until it was completed in February 2013. Most of the film was produced at Seneca's Animation Arts Centre in Toronto, with three Seneca students also working on the film at the NFB's Animation Studio in Montreal. Subconscious Password was the first stereoscopic 3D film for Seneca College.

The images of celebrities used in the film were developed from a variety of sources, with Sammy Davis, Jr. appearing via live-action footage available in the public domain and James Joyce derived from photos projected onto a pseudo-3D character. The computer animation was created with Autodesk Maya, with opening title sequences animated with SANDDE (Stereoscopic Animation Drawing Device), a digital animation technology created by IMAX that allows artists to create hand-drawn animation in 3D space, and which has been licensed to the NFB to develop creative applications.

Landreth has stated that the film begins "relatively flat", using more stereoscopic depth to immerse audiences as the film progresses.

Release
Subconscious Password was named best short film at the 2013 Annecy International Animated Film Festival. The film had its Canadian premiere at the 2013 Toronto International Film Festival. In December 2013, the film was named to the Toronto International Film Festival's annual top ten list, in the short film category. On March 9, 2014, Subconscious Password was named best animated short at the Canadian Screen Awards.

References

External links

2013 films
2013 comedy films
2013 computer-animated films
2013 3D films
Canadian 3D films
Canadian comedy short films
Seneca College
National Film Board of Canada animated short films
Films directed by Chris Landreth
Computer-animated short films
Films based on television series
Films about memory
2010s animated short films
3D animated short films
English-language Canadian films
2010s English-language films
2010s Canadian films
Copperheart Entertainment films